Laurent and Larry Nicolas Bourgeois (born December 6, 1988), professionally known as Les Twins, are French dancers, choreographers, producers, models, designers, and creative directors of their brand "Eleven Paris". Often referred to by their respective nicknames, "Lil Beast" and "Ca Blaze", they are recognized internationally for their talents in new style hip-hop dancing, and various dancing styles. They are identical twin brothers.

Born and raised in Sarcelles, France, the self-taught dance duo became the darlings of the French audience in 2008 as finalists on the popular television show Incroyable Talent. They quickly rose to prominence in the United States after a video of their performance on the San Diego leg of the 2010 World of Dance tour went viral on YouTube, with over 46 million views . In 2011, they won the hip-hop new style division of the prestigious international street dance competition Juste Debout. In 2017, they won the American reality competition series World of Dance, executively produced by Jennifer Lopez. The series featured solo acts and larger groups, competing for a grand prize of US$1 million.

Les Twins have been featured dancers for various music artists, including Beyoncé, Meghan Trainor, and Missy Elliott. Standing at 6'4" (193 cm) tall, the brothers have modeled for French haute couture fashion designer Jean Paul Gaultier and appeared in many high-profile, commercial advertising campaigns, such as YSL, Chanel, Gucci, Prada, Versace, Jay-Z's Rocawear, Givenchy, and Beats by Dre. They have also walked for many shows before becoming celebrities. They also signed with The Jordan Family.

In addition to teaching their original choreography in workshops around the globe, they are also the founding members of the successful dance team Criminalz Crew and founding members of "Eleven Paris".

Early life and career beginnings 
The twins were born on December 6, 1988, in Sarcelles, a commune in the northern projects of Paris, France. They are the youngest in a large, Guadeloupean extended family of 9 children.

Neither Larry nor Laurent received any formal dance training. Instead, they learned by observing other breakers, lockers, and poppers and by teaching themselves classical ballet techniques. At the age of 12, they began performing in concerts and musicals. According to WAD Magazine, "They were born dancers. They walked at 5 months, seriously moved their bodies at 18 months old, and at 9 they showed off steps they had invented to youngsters twice their age in their neighborhood."

In 2005, the brothers recruited five members to form their own dance team called Criminalz Crew, spending the next few years competing in hip-hop tournaments and entertaining crowds as street performers and in clubs.  In 2007, they danced to sold-out audiences in the musical Pas de Quartier at France's esteemed Avignon Festival.

Dance career 
In March 2008 Les Twins gained the attention of the dance community by defeating French street dancers Joseph Go and Meech Onomo at the semi-finals of the prestigious international dance competition Juste Debout. On November 13, 2008, the twins were among the top twelve finalists competing on the Incroyable Talent finale show attended by Princess Stéphanie of Monaco and watched by over 4 million viewers. In 2009, they were contracted to perform the two-man hip-hop comedy stage revue Twins choreographed by their long-time coach Abibou "Playmo" Kébe at the Théâtre Trévise in Paris.

In August 2010, a video of their performance on the World of Dance tour in San Diego went viral on YouTube.  On November 9, 2010, they made their U.S. television debut on The Ellen DeGeneres Show.

In March 2011 the twins won the Hip-hop New Style division at Juste Debout, beating out over 353 dancers.  That same year they performed alongside Beyoncé at the 2011 Billboard Music Awards, the U.K.'s Glastonbury Festival, the BET Awards, and the Good Morning America Summer Concert Series, garnering even greater attention on the world stage. They also joined her on the French television shows X-Factor and Le Grand Journal to promote her then upcoming album 4, and were the only featured male dancers in the alternate version of her "Run the World (Girls)" music video. Their collaboration with Knowles would continue in May 2012 at the Revel Presents: Beyoncé Live concert series in Atlantic City.

Larry and Laurent were star dancers on the Michael Jackson: The Immortal World Tour by Cirque du Soleil until December 2011.

On March 6, 2012, the pair joined rapper Big Sean on-stage at the after-party for Kanye West's Fall 2012 fashion show at La Halle Freyssinet in Paris. One month later, they performed with Missy Elliott and Timbaland at Hennessy's "Wild Rabbit" campaign launch event in New York.

Les Twins debuted on Japan's largest television network Nippon TV on July 24, 2012.

During November 2012 they guest starred on the television dance competition Everybody Dance! in Ukraine and teamed up again with Missy Elliott at the Beats on the Beach event in Abu Dhabi and the Back2Black Festival in Rio de Janeiro, Brazil.

In December 2012 the twins began working on multiple projects with Sony Japan. In 2013, they toured with Beyoncé as the only male dancers on The Mrs. Carter Show World Tour. The duo was also featured in the music video of "Blow" and "Jealous" from Beyoncé's self-titled fifth studio album.

In 2012 and 2014, Les Twins appeared in episodes of Avengers of eXtreme Illusions, the revolutionary dance series by Welling Films. After the videos came out, Les Twins put their own cut of Welling's work on their own YouTube channel.

In 2014, Les Twins joined Beyoncé and her husband Jay-Z on their On the Run Tour. In 2015, Les Twins appeared in a special freestyle dance in the song "Tattoo" in Bollywood film ABCD 2, which was directed by Remo D'Souza. They also joined Beyoncé at her Coachella performance, entitled Beychella.

Modeling 
Les Twins are signed with NEXT Model Management in Paris. In 2010, they walked the runway at Paris Fashion Week for the Jean Paul Gaultier Fall 2010 Men's Collection.

They have since been featured in numerous web, television, and print advertising campaigns, including for Jay-Z's viral video campaign "That's Rocawear", New Era, Benetton, Givenchy, H&M, Adidas, Pioneer Steez, EMOBILE, 25 Magazine, Beats By Dre, and Hewlett-Packard.

Choreography 

Larry and Laurent have traveled the globe teaching their original choreography in countries including France, the U.S, Japan, Canada, Russia, Germany, Italy, Finland, Ukraine, Poland, Hungary, the Czech Republic, and Kyrgyzstan. Crowds of up to 5000 people have been in attendance at some of their international dance workshops.

In 2010, they choreographed the dance sequence to the song Jump by Kris Kross in the Wii video game Just Dance 2.

In June 2011, Fox broadcast a portion of the audition piece of contestants D*Day (Damon Bellmon and Deon Lewis) on Season 8 of the dance competition So You Think You Can Dance. Although they were accused by many of plagiarizing their choreography from Les Twins' World of Dance San Diego performance on YouTube, D*Day was allowed to proceed to the next stage of the competition. In 2012, Bellman and Lewis returned on the SYTYCD Season 9 Atlanta auditions show claiming (with archived footage from the Show) their prior year's routine was a homage to Les Twins’ work.

Artistry

Dance style 
Les Twins’ dance style is often categorized as  New Style hip-hop, a commercial form of hip hop with a strong emphasis on isolations and musicality.  However, the twins are known for having created a unique style from this dance which they refer to as "Twins-Style". Due to their ability to anticipate and finish each other's moves, the brothers quickly gained a reputation for their timing and skill at making freestyle dance look like choreography.  Charlotte Guillemin of WAD Magazine wrote:

Influences 
Larry and Laurent credit their major inspirations as Jim Carrey, Jackie Chan, Bruce Lee,  Michael Jackson, their coach Abibou "Playmo" Kébe, cartoons, and their own siblings, all of whom are also dancers.

Public image 
Les Twins are immediately recognizable for their large afros and trademark style of dress—backwards pants, neck warmers, and kneepads worn around the ankles. Regarding their tendency to adopt other unique accessories, such as beaded bracelets and necklaces, wristbands, watch chains, scarves, and ladies’ wear, Laurent stated: "We have changed consciousness about fashion."

Television appearances 
2008
 Oct 2 – Nov 13: Incroyable Talent (France) – contestants/finalists
2010
 Nov 9: The Ellen DeGeneres Show (U.S.) – guests
 Nov 12: ABC News (U.S.) – featured in interview on turfing dance style
2011
 May 22: 2011 Billboard Music Awards (U.S.) – performed with Beyoncé
 June 26: Glastonbury Festival 2011 (U.K.) – live televised BBC performance with Beyoncé
 June 26: 2011 BET Awards (U.S.) – pre-taped footage from Glastonbury performance with Beyoncé
 June 27: X Factor (France) – performed with Beyoncé
 June 28: Le Grand Journal (France) – performed with Beyoncé
 Nov 8: Dancing With the Stars (U.S.) – performed with the Michael Jackson: The Immortal World Tour
 Aug 17: Les Twins: Born to Dance (U.K.) –  BET International documentary
2012
 May 24: The Making Of A Concert Part 1 of 2 (U.S.) – footage from Revel Presents: Beyoncé Live performance
 July 24: Star Draft Conference (Nippon TV/Japan) – guests/judges
 Nov 9: Everybody Dance! (Ukraine) – guests
 Nov 17: Dancer's World "Les Twins Special" (Japan) – Music On! TV interview with host Sam
2013
 Feb 3: Beyoncé O2 Priority TV Ad (U.K.) – promotion of The Mrs. Carter Show World Tour
 Feb 16: Life Is But a Dream HBO special (U.S.) – rehearsal footage from the 2011 Billboard Music Awards
 Feb 22: VH-1 Best Week Ever (U.S.) – commentary on Les Twins' appearance in Life Is But a Dream
 Mar 31: Vivement Dimanche (France) – actress Monica Bellucci discusses discovering Les Twins via footage from their final 2008 Incroyable Talent performance
 May 19: Beats By Dre Neon Mixr Commercial (U.S.) – promotion of Neon Mixr headphones for Target retail stores
 June 1: Chime For Change's "The Sound of Change Live" charity concert at London's Twickenham Stadium (broadcast to 150 countries) – performed with Beyoncé
 June 2: "The Women's Concert for Change: Live from London" (U.S.) – NBC 2-hour special with highlights from the live Chime For Change concert performance
2014
 Jan 29: The Arsenio Hall Show (U.S.) – guests
 Jan 31: 106 & Park (U.S.) – guests
 Apr 21: Encontro com Fátima Bernardes (Brazil) – guests
 Aug 24: MTV Video Music Awards (U.S.) – performed with Beyoncé
 Sep 3:  So You Think You Can Dance Season 11 finale show (U.S.) – guest performers
 Nov 26: HP Pavilion x360 "Bend the Rules" Commercial (U.S.)
2015
 Feb 11: The Queen Latifah Show (U.S.) – guests
 Jun 10: The AppNexus Summit (Europe) (King's Place London, U.K.)
 Jun 11: Marrakech du rire (Morocco) – guests & performed with Jamel Debbouze
2017
 Les Twins competed and won the first season of the 2017 reality program World of Dance.
 Aug 24: Telemundo interview & "Premios Tu Mundo" (TV station) - Guests & Performed
2018
 Révolution (Canada) – Judges

2019

 Dance Plus 5 (India): guests

Film appearances

Music video appearances 
 "Danse avec moi" by Les Déesses (2007)
 "Joie de Vivre (Zouglou Dance)" by Magic System (2008)
 "Ca fait mal Remix" by La Fouine (2008)
 "Dilly Dally" by Hakimakli featuring Jamie Shepherd (2009)
 "La Gloria" by French-Argentine band Gotan Project (2010)
 "Run the World (Girls)" alternate video by Beyoncé (2011)
 "End of Time: Live at Roseland" by Beyoncé (2011)
 "Play Hard" by David Guetta featuring Ne-Yo and Akon (2013)
 "Now Is The Time" by Wally Lopez featuring Jasmine Villegas for Pepsi (2013)
 "Blow" by Beyoncé (2013)
 "Jealous" by Beyoncé (2013)
 "Flawless (Remix)" featuring Nicki Minaj by Beyoncé (2014)
 "Bang It To The Curb" by Far East Movement (2014)
 "Lips Are Movin" by Meghan Trainor (2014)
 "Ayo" by Chris Brown and Tyga (2015)
 "Dope Walk" by A$AP Ferg feat. Cara Delevingne (2015)
 "Sapés comme jamais" by Maître Gims feat. Niska (2015)
 "WTF (Where They From)" by Missy Elliott featuring Pharrell Williams (2015)
 "Ándale" by Oryane & Jillionaire (Major Lazer) feat. Mical Teja (2021)
 "Stranger" by Les Twins (2021)
 Mirror by Les Twins (2021)

Awards and nominations 
 Won – 2010 Battle of the Stylez - Germany
 Won – 2011 Juste Debout Japan (Preselections): Hip-hop New Style Division
 Won – 2011 Juste Debout Finals: Hip-hop New Style Division
 Won – 2011 Dance@Live Japan Hip-hop West Division (battled each other in the finals - Laurent won individually)
 Nominated – 2011 Youth Rocks Awards: Rockin’ Dance Group of the Year
 Won – 2012 Hip Hop International: All Styles Final World Battle (Larry won individually)
 Won – 2012 Freestyle Session 15: Top Styles/All Styles Division
 Won – 2014 World of Dance Industry Awards - Simple Mobile Game Changer Freestyle Award
 Won – 2014 World of Dance All Styles 2 vs. 2 Final, Las Vegas
 Won – 2015 Full Force “7 to Smoke” All Styles Battle, Las Vegas (Larry won individually)
 Nominated – 2015 World of Dance Industry Awards - Simple Mobile Game Changer Freestyle Award
 Nominated – 2015 Teen Choice Awards - Choice Dancer
 Won - 2017 World of Dance
 Won - 2022 Fusion Concept Festival World Final

Gallery

See also
 List of dancers

References 

<ref name="Fusionconcept"></rev>

External links 
 

1988 births
French dance groups
Hip hop dance
Living people
French twins
French male models
French people of Guadeloupean descent
21st-century French dancers
Dancers from Paris
French male dancers